Fritz Nikolai (born 1 September 1925) was an Austrian footballer. He competed in the men's tournament at the 1952 Summer Olympics.

References

External links
 
 

1925 births
Possibly living people
Austrian footballers
Austria international footballers
Olympic footballers of Austria
Footballers at the 1952 Summer Olympics
Place of birth missing
Association football goalkeepers
FK Austria Wien players